The Rising is the twelfth studio album by American recording artist Bruce Springsteen, released on July 30, 2002, on Columbia Records. An immediate critical and commercial success, it was Springsteen's first to top the US Billboard 200 since Tunnel of Love (1987). Hailed as a triumphant return to form for Springsteen, the album won two Grammy awards and marked the start of a successful collaboration with producer Brendan O'Brien. The Rising came seven years after The Ghost of Tom Joad (1995), the longest interlude between studio albums for the artist, and was his first in almost two decades with the E Street Band, with whom he had recently completed a highly successful reunion tour. The album is based in large part on Springsteen's reflections in the aftermath of 9/11.

Background and recording
Springsteen felt compelled to record the album when, in the aftermath of the attacks on September 11, 2001, a stranger in an adjacent vehicle rolled down his window and said: "We need you now". A few of the songs were written before the attacks. The title track tells the story of a firefighter going up the World Trade Center as survivors flee, and evokes the image of peoples' spirits rising up like angels with a "dream of life". "My City of Ruins" was originally performed in, and written about, Asbury Park. After Springsteen performed it on a post-September 11 America: A Tribute to Heroes telethon, the song achieved a particular resonance. "Further On (Up the Road)" was performed live in Madison Square Garden at the end of the Springsteen–E Street Reunion Tour, and was professionally recorded, although it was not included in the HBO, DVD, or CD versions of Bruce Springsteen & the E Street Band: Live in New York City. "Waitin' on a Sunny Day" was originally written in the 1990s and played during a soundcheck on the Reunion Tour. Springsteen has commented that "Nothing Man" was originally completed in 1994, but re-recorded for this album. "Worlds Apart," the most experimental song on the album, features a heavy Middle Eastern influence along with Qawwali singers in the introduction. "The Fuse," another experimental track, features a subtle hip hop beat and vocal looping. A re-recorded version of the song, with an orchestral backing, features in the Spike Lee-directed film 25th Hour. "Mary's Place" is directly inspired by Sam Cooke's "Meet Me at Mary's Place"; The gospel-like "My City of Ruins" is organized around the melody line of Curtis Mayfield's "People Get Ready".

Release
Following the biggest pre-release promotion of Springsteen's career  and a tour, The Rising became Springsteen's sixth No. 1 album on the US Billboard 200, and topped the charts in six other countries, including the UK.

Critical reception

The Rising received widespread acclaim from critics. Metacritic gave it an aggregate score of 82 / 100, based on 21 reviews. In Rolling Stone, Kurt Loder lauded it as a triumphant and cohesive album that possesses a "bold thematic concentration and penetrating emotional focus". Thom Jurek of AllMusic called it "one of the very best examples... of how popular art can evoke a time period and all of its confusing and often contradictory notions, feelings and impulses." David Browne, writing in Entertainment Weekly, felt that Springsteen's message had a renewed relevance, while his occasionally overburdened lyrics were saved by lively and vivid music. Keith Phipps of The A.V. Club wrote that the musically confident album showcased Springsteen's strength as an empathic songwriter. Uncut magazine called The Rising "a brave and beautiful album of humanity, hurt and hope from the songwriter best qualified to speak to and for his country ... A towering achievement."

In a mixed review for The Guardian, Alexis Petridis found the music to be awkwardly old-fashioned, with the best songs featuring strong melodies, as he judged the lyrics to be simplistic and unambiguous. Keith Harris of The Village Voice criticised it as being vague and unworldly, and lacking in real-life characters "responding in their idiosyncratic ways." Robert Christgau cited "Paradise", "Nothing Man", "The Rising", and "My City of Ruins" as "choice cuts", but concluded that the album "isn't worth your time or money". He felt that a marked patriotism "dragged down" the album with "overburdened emotions and conceptual commonplaces".

The Rising was voted the sixth-best album of 2002 in the Pazz & Jop. Christgau, the poll's creator and supervisor, ranked the title track as the year's tenth best single. Kludge included it on their best albums of 2002. In 2011, Rolling Stone named it the fifteenth best album of the 2000s. The album was also included in the book 1001 Albums You Must Hear Before You Die. It won the Grammy Award for Best Rock Album in 2003; although nominated for the Album of the Year award as well, it was beaten by Norah Jones's debut album Come Away with Me. The title song "The Rising" was also a Grammy recipient.

Legacy
Although The Rising was a response to 9/11, many see it as a more universal anthem of resilience and hope. On the tenth anniversary of 9/11, Dan DeLuca of the Philadelphia Inquirer said: "The songs make contextual sense in the aftermath of 9/11, but the specific details that give them power are allusive. 'Lonesome Day,' 'You're Missing,' and 'My City of Ruins' are about the hollowing devastation of that day, but the language is universal, so the sentiments are by no means frozen in time."  The song "My City of Ruins" has been used in response to tragedies other than 9/11, such as the devastation of Hurricane Katrina and the 2011 Christchurch earthquake. In 2006, while on tour supporting his We Shall Overcome: The Seeger Sessions album, Springsteen performed the song at the New Orleans Jazz & Heritage Festival. The song received an emotional response from the crowd given its refrain of "Come on rise up!" "The Rising", given its message of hope in the face of adversity, was featured prominently at the 2020 Democratic National Convention.

Track listing
This album was published as a double LP. Track 1 - 4, 5 - 8, 9 - 11, 12 - 15 were recorded respectively on the four sides.

Tour edition bonus DVD
"The Rising" [live, 2002 MTV Video Music Awards performance]
"Waitin' on a Sunny Day" [live, The Rising Tour, Barcelona, Spain, 2002]
"Lonesome Day" [music video]
"Mary's Place" [The Rising Tour, Barcelona, Spain, 2002]
"Dancing in the Dark" [The Rising Tour, Barcelona, Spain, 2002]

Personnel
Adapted from the liner notes:
Bruce Springsteen – lead guitar, vocals, acoustic guitar, baritone guitar, harmonica
Roy Bittan – keyboards, piano, mellotron, Kurzweil, pump organ, Korg M1, crumar
Clarence Clemons – saxophone, background vocals
Danny Federici – Hammond B3, Vox Continental, Farfisa
Nils Lofgren – electric guitar, Dobro, slide guitar, banjo, background vocals
Patti Scialfa – vocals
Garry Tallent – bass guitar
Steven Van Zandt – electric guitar, background vocals, mandolin
Max Weinberg – drums
Additional musicians
Soozie Tyrell – violin (tracks 1-3, 7, 8, 10-13, 15) , background vocals (tracks 1-3, 8, 10-13, 15)
Brendan O'Brien – hurdy-gurdy (tracks 2, 6), glockenspiel (tracks 2, 3), orchestra bells (track 3)
Larry Lemaster – cello (tracks 1, 12)
Jere Flint – cello (tracks 1, 12)
Jane Scarpantoni – cello (tracks 2, 11, 13, 15)
 Nashville String Machine (tracks 5, 12):
 Carl Gorodetzky – contractor, concert master, violin
 Pam Sixfin, Lee Larrison, Conni Ellisor, Alan Umstead, Dave Davidson, Mary Kathryn Vanosdale, David Angell – violins
 Kris Wilkinson, Gary Vanosdale, Jim Grosjean, Monisa Angell – viola
 Bob Mason, Carol Rabinowitz, Julie Tanner, Lynn Peithman – celli
 Ricky Keller – strings arrangement, conductor
 Asif Ali Khan and group – vocal guests (track 7):
 Asif Ali Khan – lead singer
 Karamat Ali Asad – harmonium
 Haji Nazir Afridi – tabla
 Manzoor Hussain Shibli, Sarfraz Hussain, Raza Hussain, Imtiaz Shibli, Shahnawaz Hussain Khan, Bakhat Fayyaz Hussain, Omerdaz Hussain Aftab, Waheed Hussain Mumtaz
 Alliance Singers (tracks 8, 11):
 Carinda Carford – contractor, choir
 Michelle Moore – choir solo
 Tiffeny Andrews, Antionette Moore, Antonio Lawrence, Jesse Moorer – choir
 The Miami Horns (track 11):
 Mark Pender – trumpet
 Mike Spengler – trumpet 
 Rich Rosenberg – trombone
 Jerry Vivino – tenor sax
 Ed Manion – baritone sax

Technical

 Brendan O'Brien – production, mixing
 Nick Didia – engineering
 Karl Egsieker – second engineering
 Billy Bowers – additional engineering
 Toby Scott – additional engineering (track 8)
 Melissa Mattey – second engineering for Nashville String Machine (track 5)
 Chuck Plotkin – recording engineering for Asif Ali Khan and Group (track 7)
 Dave Reed – engineering for Asif Ali Khan and Group (track 7)
 Bryan Humphrey – second engineering for Asif Ali Khan and Group (track 7)
 Bob Ludwig – mastering
 Laurie Flannery – digital editing
 Chris Austopchuk – art direction
 Dave Bett – art direction, design
 Michelle Holme – design
 Danny Clinch – photography

Charts

Weekly charts

Year-end charts

Certifications and sales

See also
 The Rising, 9/11 attack memorial

References

External links
 
 Audio and lyrics 

Bruce Springsteen albums
2002 albums
Music of Atlanta
Music about the September 11 attacks
Albums produced by Brendan O'Brien (record producer)
Columbia Records albums
Grammy Award for Best Rock Album
Concept albums